Lower Yemen and Upper Yemen are traditional regions of the north western highland mountains of Yemen. Northern Highlands and Southern Highlands are terms more commonly used presently.  The Sumara Mountains just south of the town of Yarim denote the boundaries of the two regions. These two traditional regions also coincide with Gourchenour and Obermeyer's ecological zones. Major urban centers include Ibb and Taiz.

Regions of Yemen
Geography of Yemen